Welkom-Gimnasium is an academic secondary school in Welkom, South Africa. Founded in 1953 as an Afrikaans school, the school has been a dual-medium school offering classes in English since 1996. Welkom-Gimnasium is well known for its rivalry with Goudveld Hoërskool.

External links 
 

1953 establishments in South Africa
Bilingual schools in South Africa
Educational institutions established in 1953
Schools in the Free State (province)